Jitka Schneiderová (born 23 March 1973) is a Czech film, television and stage actress. She studied at the Janáček Academy of Music and Performing Arts in Brno. She acted at Studio Ypsilon in Prague between 1996 and 2003. Schneiderová  took part in the Czech television series StarDance in 2015, finishing second with dancing partner Marek Dědík behind winners Marie Doležalová and Marek Zelinka.

She has appeared in several Theatre Studio DVA productions.

Selected filmography 
Nováci (1996, television)
Loners (2000)
Ďáblova lest (2009)
Lost in Munich (2015)
Přístav (2015–2016, television)

References

External links

1973 births
Living people
Czech film actresses
Czech television actresses
Czech stage actresses
People from Znojmo
20th-century Czech actresses
21st-century Czech actresses
Janáček Academy of Music and Performing Arts alumni